The Milwaukee Mustangs were a professional arena football team based in Milwaukee, Wisconsin. The team was a member of the Arena Football League, playing from 1994 to 2001. The owner of the Mustangs was Andrew Vallozzi. The Mustangs played their home games at the Bradley Center in Milwaukee, Wisconsin.

History

Expansion
The team was founded in August 1993, when Andrew Vallozzi was approved by the league for expansion. The city of Milwaukee became football hungry, after renovations to Lambeau Field led to speculation that the Green Bay Packers would soon stop playing games in Milwaukee, something they'd been doing since 1933. Later that year, the Packers would confirm the rumors and announced that their December 1994 contest at Milwaukee County Stadium would be their last.

For many in the Milwaukee area, the Mustangs helped fill the void left by the Packers. The team never finished lower than eighth in seasonal attendance, regularly drawing in the 14,000's and 15,000's (at a time when average attendance was approx. 8,500). The Mustangs even led the AFL in attendance in 1996.

Ending
After the 2001 season, the Mustangs lost their lease at the Bradley Center. When it was unable to find a replacement facility, the league folded the team. Milwaukee was left without an arena football team until 2008, with the formation of the Milwaukee Bonecrushers of the Continental Indoor Football League, who played their home games at the U.S. Cellular Arena. A year later, the Milwaukee Iron began play in the Arena Football 2 League across the street at te Bradley Center. In January 2011, it was announced that the Milwaukee Iron, now of the Arena Football League would be changing its name to the Milwaukee Mustangs.

Season-by-season

Players of note

Final roster

Retired uniform numbers

Note: These players' numbers were retired by the Milwaukee Iron in 2009.

Arena Football Hall of Famers

Individual awards

All-Arena players
The following Mustangs players were named to All-Arena Teams:
 WR/LB Gary Compton (2)
 WR/DB Sean Riley (1)
 OL/DL Ralph Jarvis (2), Ernest Allen (1)
 K Kenny Stucker (2), Steve Videtich (1)

All-Ironman players
The following Mustangs players were named to All-Ironman Teams: 
 WR/DB Sean Riley (1)
 WR/LB Gary Compton (2)

All-Rookie players
The following Mustangs players were named to All-Rookie Teams:
 QB Kevin McDougal
 FB/LB Odell Parks
 OL/DL Mike Ivey

Head coaches

References

External links
 Milwaukee Mustangs at ArenaFan.com

 
Defunct Arena Football League teams
Sports in Milwaukee
American football teams in Wisconsin
1994 establishments in Wisconsin
2001 disestablishments in Wisconsin
American football teams established in 1994
American football teams disestablished in 2001